The term Celtic Society is used to refer to a type of student society at the four ancient universities of Scotland, which were founded between the late 18th to mid-19th centuries in the wake of the Celtic Revival and Romanticism with the primary aim of supporting the practical and academic study of the Scottish Gaelic language and culture. These societies are the oldest at their respective universities, and were instrumental in campaigning for the establishment of academic departments dedicated to Gaelic Studies.

St Andrews University Celtic Society, founded , was the first of these student societies. In the 20th century, as the other ancient universities began offering Gaelic as an academic subject, students with an interest in Gaelic chose to attend these instead. Consequently, the society at St Andrews shifted its focus towards Scottish country dance, and is no longer related to the other three societies.

List 
The following three societies are extant and continue to promote Gaelic language and culture as their main objective, or as part of their main objective:
 Aberdeen University Celtic Society, founded 
 Glasgow University Ossianic Society, founded

References 
 
 

Educational organisations based in Scotland